Ride On is the fourth studio album by American heavy metal band Texas Hippie Coalition. Released on October 7, 2014 via Carved Records, the album was produced by Bob Marlette and Skidd Mills. The lyric video for the first single, "Monster in Me", was released on August 19, 2014.

Track listing

Personnel 
 Big Dad Ritch – lead vocals
 John Exall – bass
 Cord Pool – guitar
 Timmy Braun – drums

Charts

References

External links 

2014 albums
Texas Hippie Coalition albums